Howard L. Shaw was a  long propeller driven freighter that operated on the Great Lakes of North America from her launching in 1900 to her retirement 1969. She is currently serving as a breakwater in Ontario Place on Lake Ontario.

History
Howard L. Shaw was built by the Detroit Shipbuilding Company of Wyandotte, Michigan. She was launched on 15 September 1900 as hull #136. she began service on 2 October 1900. On 1 November 1900, Howard L. Shaw loaded 260,000 bushels of flax in Duluth, Minnesota which was a new port record. The cost of the cargo was valued at $468,000.

In 1902 Howard L. Shaw was purchased by U.S. Steel. In 1904 Howard L. Shaw was transferred to the Pittsburgh Steamship Company. On 25 May 1906 Howard L. Shaw passed between the cable connecting the steamer Coralia and her barge Maia which raked the deck of spars and the smokestack. Howard L. Shaw ran aground after the collision. Howard L. Shaw was the last vessel to see the wooden steamer John Owen on 12 November 1919 before she was lost in a storm on Lake Superior. In 1922 Howard L. Shaws hull was reconstructed with arch frames by the Toledo Shipbuilding Company of Toledo, Ohio, while in Toledo she also had her old boilers replaced by brand new Scotch marine boilers. On 26 April 1926, Howard L. Shaw ran aground in Mud Lake while downbound from the St. Marys River.

Canadian registry

Howard L. Shaw was sold to the Upper Lakes & St. Lawrence Transportation Company (renamed Upper Lakes Shipping Ltd. in 1959) in late 1940 (her Canadian identification was C172356). On 13 December 1958 Howard L. Shaw while downbound was stuck in ice delaying eleven other freighters. On 
6 September 1963 Howard L. Shaw was dynamited in Chicago, Illinois because of a labor dispute between American and Canadian labor unions. The explosion blew a  hole in the port side of the vessel. The ship was later towed to Chicago, Illinois for repairs. Howard L. Shaw was tied up at a pier since 22 April.

Breakwater

Howard L. Shaw was sold to the Toronto Harbor Commissioners. On 4 July 1969 she was sunk as a breakwater at Ontario Place along with her fleet mates the steamers Douglas Houghton and Victorius. All three vessels remain in Ontario Place as of 2020.

References

1900 ships
Ships built in Wyandotte, Michigan
Maritime incidents in 1906
Maritime incidents in 1963
Great Lakes freighters
Ships sunk as breakwaters
Merchant ships of the United States
Steamships of the United States
Ships powered by a triple expansion steam engine
Shipwrecks of the Ontario coast